Nassarius priscardi is a species of sea snail, a marine gastropod mollusk in the family Nassariidae, the Nassa mud snails or dog whelks.

Description
The shell grows to a length of 16 mm.

Distribution
This species occurs in the Indian Ocean off Madagascar.

References

  Bozzetti L. (2006) Nassarius (Hima) priscardi (Gastropoda: Prosobranchia: Nassariidae) nuova specie dal Madagascar Meridionale. Malacologia Mostra Mondiale 53: 17.

External links
  Galindo, L. A.; Puillandre, N.; Utge, J.; Lozouet, P.; Bouchet, P. (2016). The phylogeny and systematics of the Nassariidae revisited (Gastropoda, Buccinoidea). Molecular Phylogenetics and Evolution. 99: 337-353

Nassariidae
Gastropods described in 2006